Jorge Alberto Vargas Oyola (born 30 January 1981 in Santa Rosa, El Oro) is an Ecuadorian football player. He currently plays for Deportivo Azogues.

External links

 Jorge Alberto Vargas at BDFA.com.ar 
 FEF Player Card

1981 births
Living people
People from Santa Rosa, El Oro
Association football defenders
Ecuadorian footballers
L.D.U. Quito footballers
L.D.U. Loja footballers
S.D. Aucas footballers
Delfín S.C. footballers
Deportivo Azogues footballers
L.D.U. Portoviejo footballers
C.D. Olmedo footballers